Pala may be :

Palaic language
Pela language
Pa'a language
a dialect of Patpatar language